Fábián Marozsán (born 8 October 1999) is a Hungarian tennis player.

Marozsán has a career high ATP singles ranking of world No. 160 achieved on 6 February 2023. He also has a career high ATP doubles ranking of world No. 460 achieved on 24 May 2021. He is currently the No. 2 Hungarian player.

Career

He won his maiden Challenger title in August 2022 in Banja Luka and reached the top 200 at world No. 185 on 29 August 2022.

National Representation

Marozsán represents Hungary at the Davis Cup, where he has a W/L record of 1–4.

ATP Challenger and ITF World Tennis Tour finals

Singles: 14 (7 titles, 7 runner-ups)

Davis Cup

Participations: (1–4)

   indicates the outcome of the Davis Cup match followed by the score, date, place of event, the zonal classification and its phase, and the court surface.

References

External links
 
 
 

1999 births
Living people
Hungarian male tennis players
Tennis players from Budapest
People from Érd
20th-century Hungarian people
21st-century Hungarian people